Cheshunt is a small rural village situated in the Upper King Valley in north-east Victoria, Australia. It is located about 50 km from Wangaratta and is close to the Alpine National Park.

Cheshunt Post Office opened on 2 August 1886.

The Cheshunt post office now operates out of the general store/ takeaway food shop.

Golfers play at the course of the Whitfield and District Golf Club.

Following the merger of the small local primary school in 1993 with Whitfield Primary School, primary aged children must now travel to the renamed Whitfield District Primary school a short distance up the road.

Cheshunt also has a local public/ memorial hall and several wineries in the immediate area.

A popular local recreational and fishing area is Lake William Hovel further up the valley.

Population 
By the  the population had reduced further, to 213.

References

External links
Australian Places - Cheshunt

Towns in Victoria (Australia)
Rural City of Wangaratta